Sandy Allen (1955–2008) was the tallest woman in the world.

Sandy Allen may also refer to:

Sandy Allen (cricketer) (born 1984)
Sandy Allen (D.C. Council), politician in Washington, D.C.
Sandy Lewis (softball) (born 1978), maiden name Allen

See also
Sandra Allen (disambiguation)
Alexander Allen (disambiguation)